LÉ Setanta (A15) was an auxiliary ship and training ship in the Irish Naval Service. She was named after Sétanta (Cú Chulainn), a mythical hero of the Ulster Cycle.

Liffey Dockyard in Dublin built her in 1953 as a lighthouse tender for the Commissioners of Irish Lights. She was launched as Isolde, named after the mythical Irish princess Iseult.

In 1976 the INS bought her, had her armed with two Oerlikon 20 mm cannon and renamed her Setanta. She served until 1984 when the INS sold her to Haulbowline Industries Ltd of Cork for scrap.

References

Bibliography

1953 ships
Former naval ships of the Republic of Ireland
Ships built in Ireland